Shibli National  College is an educational institution in Azamgarh of Uttar Pradesh state in India.

It was originally established by historian, educationist and social reformer Allama Shibli Nomani in 1883 as National School. Shibli was a great educationist and for a long time a companion and adviser to Sir Syed Ahmad Khan, the well known scholar and founder of Aligarh Muslim University Aligarh, India.Shibli Nomani This national school was promoted to Middle school in 1887 and further to High School in 1895, and again an intermediate college in 1942. This College was granted the status of degree College in 1946. In the beginning the college was affiliated with Agra University and in 1956 when Gorakhpur University was established its affiliation linked to that university. Its first principal Mr Basheer Ahmad Siddiqui promoted its image of education leader, however its real development as a center of higher learning was started when Shaukat Sultan became the principal in 1948. Many gold medalists of Gorakhpur university used to be from Shibli College. The Post graduate classes in the college started in 1970 in various disciplines of science and arts. Since 1988 the college is affiliated with VBS purvanchal University jaunpur and is known for its discipline, high standards and highly qualified teachers. The strength of the college is about ten thousand with almost equal number of male and female students.

Departments of the college

Faculty of science

Department of Botany, Department of Chemistry, Department of Mathematics, Department of Physics, Department of Zoology.
"Department of Computer Science"

Faculty of Arts

Department of English, Department of Geography, Department of Hindi, Department of Philosophy, Department of Psychology. Department of Sociology, Department of Urdu, Department of Arabic, Department of Defense and strategic studies, Department of Economics, Department of History, Department of political science, Department of education, Department of Persian, Department of Sanskrit.

Faculty of Commerce

Department of commerce

Faculty of Law

Department of Law

Faculty of Education

Department of teacher education (B.Ed)

References

External links 
 Official website

Education in Azamgarh
Educational institutions established in 1883
1883 establishments in India
Colleges in Azamgarh district
Shibli Nomani